Events from the 1530s in Denmark.

Incumbents
 Monarch – Frederick I (until 10 April 1533), Christian III
 Steward of the Realm — Mogens Gøye

Events
1534
 May – After Frederik I's death, a war of succession begins between supporters of the Catholic Christian II and the Protestant Christian III. The conflict becomes known as the Count's Feud. 
 16 October – In the Battles of Svenstrup, Skipper Clement's peasant army, re-enforced with professional soldiers from Count Christoffer, defeats the army of the Jutland nobility that had been sent to crush the revolt.
 18 December – A royal army led by Johan Rantzau defeats Clement's men at Aalborg where they have sort refuge. Clement is captured a few days later.
1535
 11 June – In the Battle of Øksnebjerg, on the island of Funen, Rantzau  decisively defeats the rest of Count Christoffer's army.

1536

 29 July  The last supporters of Christian II are defeated, ending the Count's Feud.
 30 October
 The Council of Noblemen agreed to the introduction of the Reformation 30 October 1536
 Christian III's håndfæstning-

1537
 Christian III did a coup d'état in Norway and made it a hereditary kingdom in a real union with Denmark that would last until 1814.
 2 September – Peder Palladius is ordained as the first Lutheran bishop of the Diocese of Zealand.

Births
1532
 27 March  Eiler Grubbe, statesman and landholder /died 1585)
 15 April – Frederick of Denmark, bishop and son of Frederick I of Denmark and Sophie of Pomerania (died 1556)
 22 November – Anne of Denmark, Electress of Saxony, princess of Denmark (died 1585 in Saxony)
1534
 1 July – Frederick II of Denmark, king of Denmark and Norway (died 1588)
1535
 Jacob Ulfeldt, diplomat and privy councillor (died 1593)
 Niels Kaas, statesman (died 1594)
1537
 Ludvig Munk, count and governor (died 1602)

Deaths
1530
 Søren Norby, naval officer
1533
 10 April – Frederick I, King of Denmark and Norway (born 1470)
 3 May  Henrik Gøye, governor and landowner
1536
 6 September – Skipper Clement, privater (born 1484)

References

 
Denmark
Years of the 16th century in Denmark